The 1917 Saint Louis Billikens football team was an American football team that represented Saint Louis University during the 1917 college football season. In their first and only season under head coach Charles M. Rademacher, the Billikens compiled a 4–3–1 record and outscored opponents by a total of 79 to 61.

Schedule

References

Saint Louis
Saint Louis Billikens football seasons
Saint Louis Billikens football